Claudine Komgang-Fotsing (born 21 April 1974) is a retired Cameroonian sprinter who specialized in the 400 metres.

She won the gold medal at the 2000 African Championships. She also competed at the 1999 World Championships and the 2000 Summer Olympics without reaching the final.

Her personal best time is 50.73 seconds, achieved in July 2000 in Mexico City.

References

External links

1974 births
Living people
Cameroonian female sprinters
Athletes (track and field) at the 2000 Summer Olympics
Olympic athletes of Cameroon
Athletes (track and field) at the 1998 Commonwealth Games
Commonwealth Games competitors for Cameroon
Olympic female sprinters